Queysi Julissa Rojas González (born 19 March 2002) is a Mexican weightlifter. She won the bronze medal in the women's 64kg event at the 2022 Pan American Weightlifting Championships held in Bogotá, Colombia.

In 2021, she won the silver medal in the women's 64kg event at the Junior Pan American Games held in Cali and Valle, Colombia. She also won the silver medal in her event at the 2022 Junior World Weightlifting Championships held in Heraklion, Greece.

Achievements

References

External links 
 

Living people
2002 births
Place of birth missing (living people)
Mexican female weightlifters
Pan American Weightlifting Championships medalists
21st-century Mexican women